The 2020 French Open – Women's Singles Qualifying is a series of tennis matches that takes place from 22 September to 25 September 2020 to determine the twelve qualifiers into the main draw of the 2020 French Open – Women's singles, and, if necessary, the lucky losers.

Seeds

Qualifiers

Lucky loser

Draw

First qualifier

Second qualifier

Third qualifier

Fourth qualifier

Fifth qualifier

Sixth qualifier

Seventh qualifier

Eighth qualifier

Ninth qualifier

Tenth qualifier

Eleventh qualifier

Twelfth qualifier

References 
 Qualifying Draw
 https://www.rolandgarros.com/en-us/results/QD?round=1

Women's Singles Qualifying
French Open - Women's Singles Qualifying
French Open by year – Qualifying